Jeppe Friborg Simonsen (born 21 November 1995) is a professional footballer who plays as a right-back or left-back for I liga club Podbeskidzie Bielsko-Biała. Born in Denmark, he represents the Haiti national team.

Club career

SønderjyskE
At the age of 19, Simonsen was promoted to the first team squad in January 2015. He also signed a new 3-year contract with SønderjyskE in January 2015.

Simonsen got his debut for SønderjyskE on 27 July 2014. He started on the bench, but replaced Silas Songani in the 74th minute in a 1-1 draw against Esbjerg fB in the Danish Superliga.

On 18 September 2015, Simonsen scored his first official goal for SønderjyskE, which became the matchwining goal. He came on the pitch in the 75nd minute replacing Andreas Oggesen, and scores to the final result, 2-1, in the 86th minute.

On 1 February 2018, Simonsen got his contract extended until the summer 2021.

Loan to HB Køge
In the summer 2016, Simonsen was loaned out to Danish 1st Division club HB Køge until the winter break. On 21 December 2016, HB Køge announced that they didn't want to keep the forward, because they were looking for a goal machine. He played 19 league matches scoring 2 goals, before returning to SønderjyskE.

Podbeskidzie
On 1 February 2022, Simonsen signed a two-and-a-half-year deal with Polish second division side Podbeskidzie Bielsko-Biała.

International career
Born in Denmark, Simonsen is of Haitian descent. His birth parents are from Haiti, but he was adopted at a young age by Danish family. A youth international for Denmark, he debuted for the Haiti national team in a 10–0 2022 FIFA World Cup qualification win over Turks and Caicos Islands on 5 June 2021.

Honours
SønderjyskE
Danish Cup: 2019–20

References

External links
 Jeppe Simonsen on SønderjyskE website
 
 Jeppe Simonsen on DBU

1995 births
Living people
People from Kolding
Haitian footballers
Haiti international footballers
Danish men's footballers
Danish expatriate men's footballers
Denmark youth international footballers
Danish people of Haitian descent
Denmark under-21 international footballers
Citizens of Haiti through descent
Association football wingers
Association football defenders
Danish Superliga players
Danish 1st Division players
I liga players
HB Køge players
SønderjyskE Fodbold players
Podbeskidzie Bielsko-Biała players
Danish expatriate sportspeople in Poland
Expatriate footballers in Poland
Sportspeople from the Region of Southern Denmark